David Min (born March 5, 1976) is an American attorney, professor, and politician. He is the Democratic senator for California's 37th Senate district, which includes portions of Orange County.  He is an attorney and was an assistant law professor at the University of California, Irvine School of Law before he became a senator.

He previously ran in the 2018 election to represent California's 45th congressional district, but was defeated in the nonpartisan blanket primary by incumbent Congresswoman Mimi Walters and fellow UC Irvine professor Katie Porter, who went on to defeat Walters in the general election.  He was elected in the 2020 elections after defeating Costa Mesa mayor and future Orange County Board of Supervisors member Katrina Foley in the primary and then by narrowly defeating incumbent Republican John Moorlach in the November election.

Biography
Born in Providence, Rhode Island to Korean American parents who first immigrated to the United States in 1972 to pursue doctoral degrees at Brown University, Min grew up in Palo Alto in the San Francisco Bay Area. He went to the University of Pennsylvania's Wharton School of Business and School of Art and Sciences, where he received his undergraduate degrees and graduated magna cum laude. Min then attended Harvard Law School, where he got his J.D.

Prior to his election to the Senate, Min was an assistant law professor at the University of California, Irvine (UCI). He focused on the law and policy of banking, capital markets, and real estate finance. He was quoted in the media for his expertise in housing finance and financial market issues. He testified about the impact of Dodd-Frank Financial Regulations to the House Financial Services Subcommittee in 2012.

Min passed the February 2022 California bar exam.

Political career
After graduating from Harvard Law School, Min worked in financial regulation. Min was a staff attorney at the U.S. Securities and Exchange Commission, Banking Committee counsel for Sen. Chuck Schumer, and counsel and senior policy advisor for the United States Congress Joint Economic Committee until becoming the associate director for Financial Markets Policy at the think tank Center for American Progress. There, he supervised the efforts of a team of specialists on housing finance reform, called the Mortgage Finance Working Group.

2018 congressional campaign
Min announced his House candidacy on April 5, 2017, challenging incumbent Rep. Mimi Walters in California's 45th congressional district. Min stated he was inspired to run for Congress after President Donald Trump temporarily suspended immigration from certain predominantly Muslim countries, which he said was a "slap in the face" to the son of two immigrants. Min said there is a new "groundswell of political consciousness" nationally among Korean Americans, with people starting to feel comfortable enough to enter politics.

Min received the endorsement of the California Democratic Party at its State Convention in February 2018 after a contentious floor fight where he barely received the necessary 60% of the vote.

Min criticized Walters for living outside of the district and for refusing to hold public or in-person town halls. Min came in third place in the primary election behind Walters and Katie Porter.  Porter went on to win the general election.

2020 State Senate campaign
On January 9, 2019, Min announced his campaign against State Senator John Moorlach to represent the California's 37th State Senate district. In the primary election, Min defeated Costa Mesa Mayor Katrina Foley, thus advancing to the general election to face against Moorlach.

Min narrowly defeated Moorlach in the fall of 2020 with 51.2% of the vote. He assumed office on December 7, 2020. His term lasts four years.

While in office, Min introduced legislation related to violence, including bills to expand protections for survivors of domestic abuse, study harassment on California's transit systems, make child custody cases private by default, and reduce gun shows and sales on state-owned property.

Min also introduced legislation to facilitate the termination of offshore oil drilling leases in Orange County following the 2021 Hungtington Beach oil spill, but it died following opposition from the oil industry and trade unions. Some lawmakers, including Bob Hertzberg, expressed concerns about the cost of Min's proposed legislation.

2024 congressional campaign 
Min announced a second campaign for Congress in January 2023, running for California's 47th congressional district. Katie Porter, the incumbent representative who defeated Min in the 2018 congressional primary, is vacating the seat to run in the 2024 United States Senate election in California.

Personal life
Min is married to Jane Stoever, a Clinical Professor of Law at UC Irvine.
His wife works on domestic violence issues. They have three children.

Electoral history

2018

2020

References

External links 
 
 Campaign website
Join California Dave Min

1976 births
21st-century American lawyers
21st-century American politicians
American people of Korean descent
American politicians of Korean descent
California lawyers
California politicians of Korean descent
Candidates in the 2018 United States elections
Democratic Party California state senators
Harvard Law School alumni
Living people
Politicians from Greater Los Angeles
University of California, Irvine faculty
University of Pennsylvania alumni
Candidates in the 2024 United States House of Representatives elections